Neave may refer to:

Places
Neave, Kentucky, an unincorporated community
Neave Township, Darke County, Ohio
Neave Island, off the coast of northern Scotland

Other uses
Neave (surname)
Neave baronets, a title in the Baronetage of Great Britain

See also
Neaves, a surname